Bachelor Father (Spanish: Papá Soltero) is a 1939 American Spanish-language comedy film directed by Richard Harlan and starring Tito Guízar, Amanda Varela and Tana.

Cast
 Tito Guízar as Carlos del Rio  
 Amanda Varela as Marta Cortez / Teresa  
 Tana as Tana  
 Paul Ellis as Cruz Ramos  
 Sarita Wooton as Lolita  
 Francisco Moreno as Cándido  
 Martin Garralaga as Pérez  
 Barry Norton as Ricardo  
 Raúl Lechuga as Tómas  
 Rosa Turich as Romualda  
 Carlos Villarías as Buenrostro 
 King Wallace as Police Sergeant 
 Lucio Villegas as Don Pedro 
 José Peña as El sordo  
 Carlos Ruffino as Crespo 
 Carlos Montalbán as Esteban 
 Daniel Rea as Agustín

References

Bibliography
 Jarvinen, Lisa. The Rise of Spanish-language Filmmaking: Out from Hollywood's Shadow, 1929-1939. Rutger's University Press, 2012.

External links
 

1939 films
1939 comedy films
1930s Spanish-language films
Spanish-language American films
American comedy films
Films directed by Richard Harlan
American black-and-white films
1930s American films